The 15705/15706 Champaran Humsafar Express is a superfast express train of the Indian Railways connecting  in Bihar and  in Delhi NCR. It is currently being operated with 15705/15706 train numbers on bi-weekly basis. The Loco reversal is done in saharsa in both the journey. The train runs from katihar with EMD Loco WDP4/4D till saharsa from Saharsa it reverses direction and takes Alco locomotive WDP/M 3A/3D till Gonda from gonda onwards it takes Electric AC engine WAP4/7 Till Old Delhi Jn. It is the only named Humsafar Express in Indian Railways.

Coach Composition 

The train is completely 3-tier AC sleeper LHB Coach designed by Indian Railways with features of LED screen display to show information about stations, train speed etc. and will have announcement system as well, Vending machines for tea, coffee and milk, Bio toilets in compartments as well as CCTV cameras.

Service

It averages  as 15705 Humsafar Superfast Express starting from  covering  in 30 hrs &  and as 15706 Humsafar Express starting from  covering  in 29 hrs 35 minutes.

Route & Halts 

 
 
 
 
 
 
 
 
 
 
 
 
 
 
 Ghaziabad Junction 
  Old Delhi

Traction
This train hauled by 3 locomotives.,

1.KIR to SHC Siliguri Diesel Loco Shed based WDP 4  / WDP 4D.

2.SHC to GD Samastipur Diesel Loco Shed based WDM 3A / WDM 3D.

3.GD to DLI Ghaziabad Electric Loco Shed based WAP 4/WAP 5 or WAP 7

See also
( 12557/12558 Saptkranti Superfast Express// 15273/15274 Satyagraha Express//12211/12212 Champaran Garibrath Express)).
 ( 19039/19040 Awadh Express)
  Kaifiyat Express
 Humsafar Express

References

External links 

 15705/Champaran Humsafar Express
 15706/Champaran Humsafar Express

Humsafar Express trains
Transport in Katihar
Transport in Delhi
Rail transport in Bihar
Rail transport in Uttar Pradesh
Rail transport in Delhi
Railway services introduced in 2018